Elaine Cameron-Weir (born 1985 in Alberta, Canada) is a contemporary visual artist known for her sculptures and installations. She currently lives and works in New York City.

Early life
Elaine Cameron-Weir was born in Alberta, Canada in 1985.

Cameron-Weir received an BFA in Drawing from Alberta College of Art and Design in 2007. She received an MFA in Studio Art from New York University in 2010.

Career
Cameron-Weir has exhibited internationally at institutions such as the New Museum in New York, the Dortmunder Kunstverein in Dortmund, Germany, and the Storm King Art Center in Mountainville, New York.

Public collections 

 Art Gallery of Ontario, Toronto, ON, CA 
 Hammer Museum, Los Angeles, CA 
 Philadelphia Museum of Art, Philadelphia, PA 
 Remai Modern, Saskatoon, SK, CA 
 The Walker Art Center, Minneapolis, MN
 Benton Museum of Art at Pomona College, Claremont, CA

References

1985 births
Living people
21st-century Canadian women artists
New York University alumni